Sir Philip Carter Goodhart (3 November 1925 – 5 July 2015) was a British Conservative politician, the son of Arthur Lehman Goodhart.

Biography
Goodhart attended the Hotchkiss School in Lakeville, Connecticut.  He contested Consett in 1950 whilst still a student at Trinity College, Cambridge.  He was elected Member of Parliament for Beckenham at a 1957 by-election, and served until his retirement in 1992.  One of the unsuccessful candidates for the nomination in 1957 was the young Margaret Thatcher.

In his book Referendum (Tom Stacey Ltd, 1971) he argued that the referendum, then under discussion in the context of the United Kingdom (UK) joining the European Economic Community (EEC), could in fact serve to entrench constitutional safeguards that the UK then – as now – lacked, quoting Arthur Balfour's contribution to the debate on the Parliament Bill (later the Parliament Act 1911): "In the referendum lies our hope of getting the sort of constitutional security which every other country but our own enjoys ..." (Referendum).  He wrote the definitive account of the referendum campaign in 1975, Full-hearted Consent, and also The 1922: The Story of the 1922 Committee (with Ursula Branston; Macmillan, 1973). He was a junior Northern Ireland minister (1979–1981) and a junior defence minister (1981). He was a member of the Founding Council of the Rothermere American Institute at the University of Oxford.

In 1950, he married Valerie Forbes Winant, niece of John Gilbert Winant; they had seven children: Arthur, Sarah, David, Rachel, Harriet, Rebecca and Daniel. The couple lived in Whitebarn, Youlbury Woods, Oxford. He died in 2015, aged 89.  One of his children is David Goodhart, director of the Demos thinktank and journalist for the Prospect magazine.

References

Sources

External links 
 

1925 births
Hotchkiss School alumni
Alumni of Trinity College, Cambridge
Conservative Party (UK) MPs for English constituencies
Knights Bachelor
2015 deaths
UK MPs 1955–1959
UK MPs 1959–1964
UK MPs 1964–1966
UK MPs 1966–1970
UK MPs 1970–1974
UK MPs 1974
UK MPs 1974–1979
UK MPs 1979–1983
UK MPs 1983–1987
UK MPs 1987–1992
King's Royal Rifle Corps officers
Lehman family
Jewish British politicians
Northern Ireland Office junior ministers
British expatriates in the United States